

Portugal
Angola – José Maria de Sousa Macedo Almeida e Vasconcelos, Governor of Angola (1829–1834)

United Kingdom
Barbados – Sir James Lyon (1829–1833)
Barbados was merged into the colony of Barbados and the Windward Islands in 1833
Barbados and the Windward Islands – Sir Lionel Smith (1833–1836)
Malta Colony – Frederick Cavendish Ponsonby, Governor of Malta (1827–1835)
Mauritius –
Charles Colville, Governor of Mauritius (1828–1833)
William Nicolay, Governor of Mauritius (1833–1840)
  New South Wales – Major-General Richard Bourke, Governor of New South Wales (1831–1837)
 Western Australia – Captain James Stirling, Governor of Western Australia (1828–1839)

See also
List of state leaders in 1833
List of religious leaders in 1833
List of international organization leaders in 1833

Colonial governors
Colonial governors
1833